Sufism in South Asia includes:

 Sufism in India
 Sufism in Pakistan
 Sufism in Sindh
Sufism in Bangladesh